The 2023 UCF Knights football team will represent the University of Central Florida (UCF) as a member of the Big 12 Conference during the 2023 NCAA Division I FBS football season. The Knights are expected to be led by Gus Malzahn in his third year as the Knights head coach. The team will play home games at FBC Mortgage Stadium in Orlando, Florida.

Previous season
The 2022 UCF Knights football team compiled an overall record of 9–5 record and a mark of 6–2 in American Athletic Conference (ACC) play. They lost in the American Athletic Conference Football Championship Game to the Tulane Green Wave by the score of 28-45. UCF was invited to the Military Bowl, where the team lost to Duke 13-30.

Offseason

Transfers

Outgoing

Incoming

Schedule

Game Summaries

Kent State

at Boise State

Villanova

at Kansas State

Baylor

at Kansas

at Oklahoma

West Virginia

at Cincinnatti

Oklahoma State

at Texas Tech

Houston

References 

UCF
UCF Knights football seasons
UCF Knights football